The 1983 PBA season was the 9th season of the Philippine Basketball Association (PBA).

Board of governors

Executive committee
 Mariano A. Yenko, Jr. (Commissioner) 
 Carlos Palanca III  (President, representing Gilbey's Gin)
 Jose Ibazeta, Jr. (Vice-President, representing San Miguel Beermen)
 Anna Dominique Coseteng (Treasurer, representing Galerie Dominique)

Teams

Season highlights
The Crispa Redmanizers completed a three-conference sweep and won their second Grandslam after first doing the trick back in 1976, this time under new coach Tommy Manotoc. 
On May 15, the PBA fans witnessed the "Black Superman" Billy Ray Bates played his first game for Crispa Redmanizers. Bates won the best import award in both Reinforced and Open Conferences, leading the Redmanizers to two championships and a grandslam.  
A rising powerhouse Great Taste Coffee with the entry of Fil-Am rookie Ricardo Brown, three-time MVP Bogs Adornado and import Norman Black in their lineup, led the Coffee Makers to their first-ever finals appearances after eight years. 
The Toyota Super Corollas played their final season in the PBA after nine years of participation, the multi-titled ballclub announced its disbandment prior to the start of the 1984 PBA season.

Opening ceremonies
The muses for the participating teams are as follows:

Champions
 All Filipino Conference: Crispa Redmanizers
 Reinforced Conference: Crispa Redmanizers
 Open Conference: Crispa Redmanizers
 Team with best win–loss percentage: Crispa Redmanizers (46-16, .742)
 Best Team of the Year: Crispa Redmanizers (5th & Final)

All-Filipino Conference

Elimination round

Semifinal round

Third place playoffs 

|}

Finals

|}

Reinforced Filipino Conference

Elimination round

Quarterfinal round

Semifinal round

Third place playoffs 

|}

Finals

|}
Best Import of the Conference: Billy Ray Bates (Crispa)

Open Conference

Elimination round

Quarterfinal round

Semifinal round

Third place playoffs 

|}

Finals

|}
Best Import of the Conference: Billy Ray Bates (Crispa)

Awards
 Most Valuable Player: Abet Guidaben (Crispa)
 Rookie of the Year: Ricardo Brown (Great Taste)
 Best Import-Reinforced/Open Conference: Billy Ray Bates (Crispa)
 Most Improved Player: Terry Saldaña (Gilbey's Gin)
 Mythical Five: 
Ricardo Brown (Great Taste)
Atoy Co (Crispa)
Abet Guidaben (Crispa)
Bogs Adornado (Great Taste)
Philip Cezar (Crispa)

Cumulative standings

References

 
PBA